The Roman Catholic Diocese of Celje is a diocese located in the city of Celje in the Ecclesiastical province of Maribor in Slovenia.

History
 April 7, 2006: Established as Diocese of Celje from the Diocese of Maribor

Leadership
 Bishops of Celje (Roman rite)
 Anton Stres (7 April 2006 — 31 January 2010)
 Stanislav Lipovšek (24 April 2010 – 18 September 2018)
 Maksimilijan Matjaž (since 5 March 2021)

Special churches
Minor basilica:
 Bazilika Marijinega obiskanja, Petrovče by Celje
 Bazilika sv. Marije lurške, Brestanica

See also
Roman Catholicism in Slovenia

Sources
 
 Official site
 GCatholic.org
 Catholic Hierarchy

Roman Catholic dioceses in Slovenia
Christian organizations established in 2006
Roman Catholic dioceses and prelatures established in the 21st century